Noyal-sous-Bazouges (literally Noyal under Bazouges) is a commune in the Ille-et-Vilaine department in Brittany in northwestern France.

Population
Inhabitants of Noyal-sous-Bazouges are called Noyalais in French.

See also
 Communes of the Ille-et-Vilaine department

References

External links

 
 Mayors of Ille-et-Vilaine Association 

Communes of Ille-et-Vilaine